Vandana Vishwas (born 17 July 1970) is a Canadian singer, musician, and composer and architect of Indian descent. She performs North Indian classical music based expressive song forms such as Ghazals, Bhajans, Geet and Thumri. She is a resident of Mississauga, Ontario, Canada.

Career 
Vandana released her debut music album 'Meera – The Lover...' in 2009. It is a musical story of the sixteenth century Indian poet Meera Bai. In January 2013, she released her second music album 'Monologues', which is a collection of contemporary Ghazals, Nazms and light Thumris. Her single, 'Samarsiddha' is the theme track for identically titled Hindi novel authored by a UK based novelist Sandeep Nayyar, which was released in July 2014. Vandana released her third music album 'Parallels' in 2016 which topped RMR charts for 4 weeks consecutively. It is a collaboration of south Asian music with several western and ethnic music genres such as Flamenco, African, Rock, Country, Ballad, New Age.

Discography

Awards

Silver medal at Global Music Awards 2016 in World Music and Female vocalist categories
Toronto Independent Music Awards 2016 in World Music category
Woman Hero Award 2015 by Indo Canadian Arts & Culture Initiative
Vox-Pop Winner for World Traditional Song at 10th IMA Independent Music Awards
Best Toronto World CD Album Winner at Toronto Exclusive Magazine awards 2010
Established Performing Arts at Mississauga Arts Council's Marty Awards 2012

Honourable mentions
17th International Billboard Song Contest 2010
Esongwriter.com song Contest]
2010 Marty Award for Established Performing Arts by Mississauga Arts council, Ontario, Canada

Nominations
TIMA Toronto Independent Music Awards 2010, 2014 & 2015 – Best World Music
World Artist of the Year at The Indies, the Independent Music Awards 2010
K.M. Hunter artist Award for Music 2010 by Ontario Arts Council, Canada
2010 & 2011 Marty Award for Established Performing Arts by Mississauga Arts council, Ontario, Canada
7th TIMA Toronto Independent Music Awards 2014 – Best World Music

References

External links
Official Website
Article in Toronto Star
Article in Toronto Sun
Article in Weekly Voice
Article in Mybindi.Com
Article in All About Jazz
Article in India Current

Living people
1970 births
Singers from Lucknow
Musicians from Lucknow
Indian emigrants to Canada
Naturalized citizens of Canada
Musicians from Mississauga
Canadian women composers
Canadian classical musicians
Canadian musicians of Indian descent
Expatriate musicians in India
Canadian expatriates in India
21st-century Canadian singers
21st-century Canadian women singers
21st-century Canadian women musicians